Developed by AdGuard Software Limited, AdGuard offers open-source, free, and shareware products. AdGuard's DNS app supports Microsoft Windows, Linux, macOS, Android and iOS. AdGuard is also available as a browser extension.

AdGuard Software Limited was founded in 2009 in Moscow. In 2014 AdGuard Software Limited's products became available in Cyprus to where its headquarters were subsequently moved.

Features 

AdGuard features include:

AdGuard Home 

AdGuard Home acts as a recursive DNS resolver, which responds with an invalid address for domains that appear in its filter lists quests. It is similar to Pi-hole.

AdGuard Browser extensions 

The browser extension blocks video ads, interstitial ads, floating ads, pop-ups, banners, and text ads. There is a possibility to handle anti-AdBlock scripts. The product also blocks spyware and warns users of malicious websites. AdGuard Content Blocker is an additional browser extension for browsers Yandex Browser and Samsung Internet, which uses Content Blocker API. It downloads filter list updates and asks browsers to enforce them via Content Blocker API.

AdGuard applications 

AdGuard has Windows and Mac versions, as well as native mobile versions for Android and iOS. The application sets up a local VPN, which filters all traffic on the mobile device.

AdGuard DNS 

AdGuard operates recursive name servers for public use. AdGuard DNS supports encryption technologies, including DNSCrypt, DNS over HTTPS, DNS over TLS, and DNS-over-QUIC. AdGuard began testing DNS service back in 2016, and officially launched it in 2018.

Reception 

While the company's products have earned positive feedback in industry publications, a series of policies by Google and Apple app stores occurred in 2014 - 2018, which impeded user access to AdGuard's mobile applications.

Macworld mentioned AdGuard for iOS in a list of five "best adblockers for iOS".

In April 2020, Android Central stated that AdGuard uses "a little more processing power to do its thing than uBlock Origin", but it is "the best all-in-one blocking tool for someone who doesn't want to use more than one extension" because it blocks cryptomining. However, Android Central recommended uBlock Origin with a dedicated cryptomining blocker over AdGuard.

Incidents 

 Distribution of AdGuard's app for Android was discontinued by Google Play at the end of 2014. It nevertheless is still being updated and has been made available for download from the developers’ own website.
 AdGuard for iOS received no updates from the summer of 2018 until summer 2019 due to Apple policies at the time against ad blocking via the iOS VPN APIs.
 In September 2018, AdGuard was hit by credential stuffing attack. AdGuard claims that their servers were not compromised and instead attackers used credential pairs reused by victims on other sites and stolen from those other sites. According to company spokesperson, they "do not know what accounts exactly were accessed by the attackers", so the company had reset passwords for all accounts "as a precautionary measure". Also, AdGuard pledged to use "Have I Been Pwned?" API to check all new passwords for appearance in known public data leaks. Furthermore, they implemented more strict password security requirements.

In November 2020, Microsoft Edge Store and Chrome web store were infiltrated with fraudulent add-ons posing as various legitimate VPN browser add-ons, including NordVPN and AdGuard's VPN add-on. Subsequently Microsoft and Google were alerted and actions were taken to remove the imposter add-ons in the various browser stores.

Research 

AdGuard developers have taken up research in order to inform wider audiences on user privacy, cybersecurity and data protection. The following issues are notable cases involving the developers:

 Top-ranked websites involved in cryptojacking
 Facebook Ad Network widespread distribution
 Alerting or reporting of fake adblockers
 Popular Android and iOS app privacy issues

References 

Ad blocking software
Android (operating system) software
Google Chrome extensions
IOS software
Privacy software
2009 software
Free and open-source software
Shareware
Free Firefox WebExtensions